The cinnamon-tailed fantail (Rhipidura fuscorufa) is a fantail restricted to the Banda Sea Islands of Indonesia.

References

External links 
 BirdLife Species Factsheet

cinnamon-tailed fantail
Birds of Wallacea
cinnamon-tailed fantail
cinnamon-tailed fantail